P. maritima may refer to:
 Plantago maritima, the sea plantain, seaside plantain or goose tongue, a plant species
 Prunus maritima, the beach plum, a tree species native to the Atlantic coast of North America

Synonyms
 Pinus maritima, a synonym for Pinus pinaster, the maritime pine, a tree species
 Piperia maritima, a synonym for Piperia elegans

See also
 Maritima (disambiguation)